is a railway station on Kintetsu Kashihara Line in Nara, Japan.

Lines 
 Kintetsu Railway
 Kashihara Line

Platforms and tracks 
The station has two side platforms serving one track each.

Environs
Tōshōdai-ji Temple
Yakushi-ji Temple

External links
 

Railway stations in Japan opened in 1921
Railway stations in Nara Prefecture